The Council of Political and Security Affairs of Saudi Arabia is one of two subcabinets of the Kingdom of Saudi Arabia, the other being the Council of Economic and Development Affairs. It is led by its Chairman Mohammad bin Salman. The Council is composed of the head of Intelligence and nine ministers. All members of the Council are appointed by royal decree. It was established by King Salman to replace the National Security Council in January 2015.

History
The Council was created to support the policymaking mechanisms of the kingdom. Upon announcing the entity on 29 January 2015, nine ministers were announced as members and the council was chaired by Prince Muhammad bin Nayef. The Council's inaugural meeting was held on 11 February 2015.

The council played an important role in Operation Decisive Storm, part of the military intervention in Yemen.

On June 21, 2017, Prince Muhammad bin Nayef was relieved of all duties by King Salman, and was replaced by Crown Prince Mohammad bin Salman.

Membership
Upon announcing the entity on 29 January 2015, nine ministers were announced as members and the council was chaired by Prince Muhammad bin Nayef. The Council's membership consists of:

References

Government agencies of Saudi Arabia
2005 establishments in Saudi Arabia